In mathematics, a differential algebraic group is a differential algebraic variety with a compatible group structure.

References

Algebraic groups